Hugo Johannes Blaschke (14 November 1881 – 6 December 1959) was a German dental surgeon notable for being Adolf Hitler's personal dentist from 1933 to April 1945 and for being the chief dentist on the staff of Reichsführer-SS Heinrich Himmler.

Life
Blaschke was born in Neustadt in West Prussia (now Wejherowo) and studied dentistry in Berlin and at the University of Pennsylvania. He trained as a dental surgeon in London and opened his own practice in late 1911. During World War I, he served as a military dentist in Frankfurt/Oder and in Berlin. After the war ended, he went back to private practice in Berlin. After treating Hermann Göring in 1930, Blaschke began seeing other top Nazi leaders for dental work. Blaschke then joined the Nazi Party on 1 February 1931. Göring recommended him to Hitler in 1933. After the successful treatment, Blaschke became Hitler's personal dentist. As well as Hitler, he also treated Eva Braun, Joseph Goebbels and Heinrich Himmler. He joined the SS on 1 May 1935 and was appointed chief dentist of the SS on 31 August 1943. He was promoted to the rank of SS-Brigadeführer on 9 November 1944.

In 1945, as the end of Nazi Germany drew near, Blaschke accompanied Hitler to the Reich Chancellery in Berlin and the Führerbunker. As the Red Army was closing in on Berlin, on 20 April, Hitler ordered Blaschke, Albert Bormann, Admiral Karl-Jesko von Puttkamer, Dr. Theodor Morell, secretaries Johanna Wolf, Christa Schroeder, and other staff to leave Berlin by aircraft for the Obersalzberg. The group flew out of Berlin on different flights by aircraft of the Fliegerstaffel des Führers over the following three days.

Post-war
In early May, Soviet Red Army soldiers captured Blaschke's dental assistant Käthe Heusermann and his technician Fritz Echtmann. Heusermann gave a detailed description of Hitler's and Eva Braun's dental bridges and made drawings of them. Thereafter, Heusermann and Echtmann were separately shown the dental remains found outside the Führerbunker, which they confirmed were those of Hitler and Braun. Both then spent years in Soviet prisons.

Blaschke was arrested by US Army troops in Austria on 20 May 1945. He was interrogated by the Americans after the war about Hitler's dental treatment, as part of the effort to identify Hitler's remains. After his release in December 1948, Blaschke practiced dentistry in Nuremberg. He reconstructed the dental records of Martin Bormann from memory, and these were later used to identify Bormann's skeletal remains, which were discovered in Berlin in 1972. Blaschke died in Nuremberg in 1959. He was buried in St. Peter Cemetery in Nuremberg.

References
Footnotes

Citations

Bibliography

External links

1881 births
1959 deaths
Nazi Party politicians
Heinrich Himmler
SS-Brigadeführer
People from Wejherowo
People from West Prussia
SS dentists
20th-century dentists